Pallav Prakashchandra Vora (born 24 January 1981 in Ahmedabad, Gujarat) is an Indian cricketer who plays for Gujarat as well as Ahmedabad Rockets. He is a right-hand wicket-keeper batsman.

References

External links
 
 

1981 births
Living people
Indian cricketers
Gujarat cricketers
Ahmedabad Rockets cricketers
Cricketers from Ahmedabad
Wicket-keepers